Boraras merah is a species of ray-finned fish in the genus Boraras, also known as Phoenix rasbora. It is between 15 and 20mm long with a red base colour to the body.

Etymology

Boraras is an anagram of Rasbora (a generic term for the group that includes this species), highlighting the reversal of the ratio of abdominal and caudal vertebrae in this species. Merah is the Indonesian word for red due to its body colour.

Distribution and habitat

It is found in southern and western Borneo where it inhabits freshwater streams and rivers with a high peat content.

References 

Boraras
Freshwater fish of Borneo
Taxa named by Maurice Kottelat
Fish described in 1991